You'd Be Surprised is a 1926 American silent film directed by Arthur Rosson and starring Raymond Griffith. A murder mystery-comedy, the production includes intertitles written by humorist Robert Benchley.

A full copy of the film is preserved in the Library of Congress.

Cast
Raymond Griffith as Mr. Green, The Coroner
Edward Martindel as Mr. White, The District Attorney
Earle Williams as Mr. Black, The Deputy District Attorney
Thomas McGuire as Inspector Brown
Dorothy Sebastian as Dorothy
Granville Redmond as Grey, A Valet
Roscoe Karns as A Party Guest
Carl M. LeViness as A Party Guest
Isabelle Keith as A Party Guest
Dick La Reno as The 'Jury' Foreman
Monte Collins as The Milkman Juror
Jerry Mandy as The Hot Dog Salesman 'Juror'

References

External links

1926 films
American silent feature films
1920s comedy mystery films
1920s English-language films
American black-and-white films
Paramount Pictures films
American comedy mystery films
Films with screenplays by Jules Furthman
Films directed by Arthur Rosson
1926 comedy films
1920s American films
Silent American comedy films
Silent mystery films